Mikhail Gennadyevich Volodin (born 21 September 1968) is a Russian professional football coach and a former player. He is an assistant coach for the Under-19 squad of PFC Krylia Sovetov Samara.

Club career
He made his professional debut in the Soviet Second League in 1988 for PFC CSKA-2 Moscow.

References

1968 births
Sportspeople from Samara, Russia
Living people
Soviet footballers
Russian footballers
Association football goalkeepers
PFC Krylia Sovetov Samara players
FC Tekstilshchik Kamyshin players
FC Lada-Tolyatti players
FC Chernomorets Novorossiysk players
FC Kuban Krasnodar players
FC Mordovia Saransk players
Russian Premier League players